Lesta Studio (also known as Wargaming Saint Petersburg) is a Russian video game development and film production company based in Saint Petersburg. From 2011 to 2022, the company was owned by Wargaming.

History 
Lesta Studio was founded on 22 December 1991. In January 1998, the studio was one of three large computer graphics companies of Saint Petersburg, alongside Positive and Creat. In 2011, the company became part of Belarusian video game company Wargaming. On its 21st anniversary in 2012, Lesta Studio had 150 employees.

On April 4, 2022, Wargaming announced that they would be pulling all operations out of Russia and Belarus, and transferring all its live games services in those regions to Lesta Studio, which was announced to no longer be affiliated with the company.
On October 12. 2022. they released 3 new games that are based on Wargaming games. The games are licensed, but their development is different. The games are Mir Tankov, Mir Korablej and Tanks Blitz.

Games developed

References

External links 
 

Russian companies established in 1991
Companies based in Saint Petersburg
Film production companies of Russia
Video game companies established in 1991
Video game companies of Russia
Video game development companies
Russian brands
2011 mergers and acquisitions